Thadius Katua (born November 4, 1997) is an amateur boxer who represented Papua New Guinea at the 2016 Summer Olympics in Rio de Janeiro. He won a gold medal at the 2015 Pacific Games.

Competing at the age of 18, Katua was the youngest boxer partaking in the 2016 Olympic tournament. Despite being outscored by opponent Adlan Abdurashidov in all three rounds, Katua's coach believed that he may have actually won the fight if the points had been tallied differently. When the judges ruled in favor of Abdurashidov many in the crowd voiced their support for Katua. Before taking part in the Olympics Katua had become the first Papua New Guinean to win a gold in boxing at the Pasic Youth Games.

References

External links

1997 births
Living people
Papua New Guinean male boxers
Olympic boxers of Papua New Guinea
Boxers at the 2016 Summer Olympics
Commonwealth Games competitors for Papua New Guinea
Boxers at the 2018 Commonwealth Games
People from the Autonomous Region of Bougainville
Lightweight boxers